Sexual Abuse is a peer-reviewed academic journal that publishes articles about the clinical and theoretical aspects of sexual abuse, including its etiology, consequences, prevention, treatment, and management strategies. It is the official journal of the Association for the Treatment and Prevention of Sexual Abuse. The editor-in-chief is Michael Seto. Ronald Langevin established the journal under the title Annals of Sex Research in 1988. It adopted the name Sexual Abuse: A Journal of Research and Treatment in 1995 and then its current name in 2015.

Abstracting and indexing 
The journal is abstracted and indexed by Current Contents/Social & Behavioral Sciences, PsycINFO, SafetyLit, Scopus, Social Care Institute for Excellence,  and the Social Sciences Citation Index. According to the Journal Citation Reports, its 2017 impact factor is 3.444, ranking it 19th out of 127 journals in the category "Psychology, Clinical" and 5th out of 61 in the category "Criminology & Penology".

Editors 
The journal has had the following editors-in-chief, with a one-year hiatus in 1994:

 Ron Langevin (1988–1993)
 Barry Maletzky (1995–1999)
 Judith Becker (2000–2003)
 Howard Barbaree (2004–2009)
 James Cantor (2010–2014)
 Michael Seto (2015–)

References

External links 
 
 Official blog

Criminology journals
Sexology journals
Quarterly journals
Publications established in 1988
English-language journals
SAGE Publishing academic journals
Academic journals associated with learned and professional societies